Sambhunath or Shambhunath is an Indian masculine given name that may refer to
Sambhunath Banerjee, Indian Bengali scholar of law
Sambhunath Naik, Indian politician 
Sambhunath Pandit (1820–1867), Indian judge of Calcutta High Court 
Shambhunath Singh (1916–1991), Indian Hindi writer, freedom fighter, poet and social worker

Indian masculine given names